Metalurh Stadium is a football-only stadium in Donetsk, Ukraine. It is currently used for football matches, and was the home of FC Metalurh Donetsk. The stadium's official maximum capacity is 5,094. It is not qualified to host UEFA competitions, therefore the team leased Shakhtar Stadium, for such games.

The stadium's full former name is the 125th Anniversary of Donetsk Metallurgical Factory Stadium.

References

1952 establishments in Ukraine
Football venues in Donetsk Oblast
Buildings and structures in Donetsk
Sport in Donetsk
Sports venues in Donetsk Oblast